Logan Craig Gillaspie (born April 17, 1997) is an American professional baseball pitcher for the Baltimore Orioles of Major League Baseball (MLB). He made his MLB debut in 2022.

Amateur career
Gillaspie attended Frontier High School from 2011-2015. He was selected to play for the Oakland Athletics in the 2014 Area Code Games. He attended Oxnard College from 2015-2017, where he pitched alongside catching and playing third base.

Professional career
Gillaspie was not drafted out of Oxnard College in 2017 and joined the Monterey Amberjacks in the Pecos League, and from there was moved up to the Salina Stockade in the American Association of Professional Baseball. After being released, he was signed by the Sonoma Stompers in the Pacific Association. In January 2018, Gillaspie played in the California Winter League and from there was signed by the United Shore Professional Baseball League to play for the Diamond Hoppers. During the USPBL 2018 season, the Milwaukee Brewers signed Gillaspie to a minor league contract.

Gillaspie played with the Rookie-level Arizona League Brewers and the Rookie-level Helena Brewers of the Pioneer League with whom he posted a 3.26 ERA over  innings. He spent the 2019 season with the Wisconsin Timber Rattlers of the Class A Midwest League, going 3-7 with a 3.96 ERA over 31 games (16 starts), striking out 92 batters over 109 innings. Gillaspie was named a Midwest League All-Star with the Timber Rattlers.

He was released by the Brewers following the end of the season, and did not play a game in 2020 due to the cancellation of the season due to the COVID-19 pandemic. Gillaspie was signed by the Baltimore Orioles for the 2021 season, and split the year between the Aberdeen IronBirds of the High-A East and the Bowie Baysox of the Double-A Northeast, going 1-3 with a 4.97 ERA over 26 relief appearances, striking out 52 batters over  innings. He was selected to play in the Arizona Fall League for the Mesa Solar Sox after the season.

On November 19, 2021, the Orioles selected Gillaspie's contract and added him to their 40-man roster. He returned to Bowie to open the 2022 season. After six appearances with Bowie, he was promoted to the Norfolk Tides of the Triple-A International League. On May 17, the Orioles promoted Gillaspie to the major leagues. He made his MLB debut that night versus the New York Yankees at Oriole Park at Camden Yards, throwing two scoreless innings in relief. On October 2, Gillaspie thew a scoreless 6th inning against the New York Yankees at Yankee Stadium to record his first Major League victory in a 3-1 Orioles win. Gillaspie finished the season with a 1-0 record with a 3.12 ERA in 17 1/3 innings pitched in 17 appearances.

References

External links

1997 births
Living people
Sportspeople from Bakersfield, California
Baseball players from California
Major League Baseball pitchers
Baltimore Orioles players
Oxnard Condors baseball players
Sonoma Stompers players
Arizona League Brewers players
Helena Brewers players
Wisconsin Timber Rattlers players
Aberdeen IronBirds players
Bowie Baysox players
Mesa Solar Sox players
Norfolk Tides players